Human physical appearance is the outward phenotype or look of human beings.

There are infinite variations in human phenotypes, though society reduces the variability to distinct categories. The physical appearance of humans, in particular those attributes which are regarded as important for physical attractiveness, are believed by anthropologists to affect the development of personality significantly and social relations. Humans are acutely sensitive to their physical appearance.  Some differences in human appearance are genetic, others are the result of age, lifestyle or disease, and many are the result of personal adornment.

Some people have linked some differences with ethnicity, such as skeletal shape, prognathism or elongated stride. Different cultures place different degrees of emphasis on physical appearance and its importance to social status and other phenomena.

Aspects 
Various aspects are considered relevant to the physical appearance of humans.

Physiological differences 

Humans are distributed across the globe except for Antarctica and form a variable species. In adults, the average weight varies from around 40 kg (88 pounds) for the smallest and most lightly built tropical people to around 80 kg (176 pounds) for the heavier northern peoples. Size also varies between the sexes, with the sexual dimorphism in humans being more pronounced than that of chimpanzees, but less than the dimorphism found in gorillas. The colouration of skin, hair and eyes also varies considerably, with darker pigmentation dominating in tropical climates and lighter in polar regions.
Genetic, ethnic affiliation, geographical ancestry.
 Height, body weight, skin tone, body hair, sexual organs, moles, birthmarks, freckles, hair color, hair texture, eye color, eye shape (see epicanthic fold and eyelid variations), nose shape (see nasal bridge), ears shape (see earlobes), body shape
Body deformations, mutilations and other variations such as amputations, scars, burns and wounds.

Long-term physiological changes 
Aging
Hair loss

Short-term physiological changes 
Blushing, crying, fainting, hiccup, yawning, laughing, stuttering, sexual arousal, sweating, shivering, nose bleeding, skin color changes due to sunshine or frost.

Clothing, personal effects, and intentional body modifications 
Clothing, including headgear and footwear; some clothes alter or mold the shape of the body (e.g. corset, support pantyhose, bra). As for footwear, high heels make a person look taller.
 Style and colour of haircut (see also mohawk, dreadlocks, braids, ponytail, wig, hairpin, facial hair, beard and moustache)
Cosmetics, stage makeup, body paintings, permanent makeup
Body modifications, such as body piercings, tattoos, scarification, subdermal implants
Plastic surgery
Decorative objects (jewelry) such as a necklaces, bracelets, rings, earrings
Medical or body shape altering devices (e.g., tooth braces, bandages, casts, hearing aids, cervical collar, crutches, contact lenses of different colours, glasses, gold teeth). For example, the same person's appearance can be quite different, depending on whether they use any of the aforementioned modifications.
Exercises, for example, bodybuilding

Other functional objects, temporarily attached to the body 
Capes
Goggles
Hair ornaments
Hats and caps
Headdresses
Headphones/handsfree phone headset
Jewelry
Masks
Prosthetic limbs
Sunglasses
Watches

See also 

Beauty
Biometrics
Body image
Deformity
Dress code
Eigenface
Face perception
Facial symmetry
Fashion
Female body shape
Hairstyle
Human variability
Human body
Hair coloring
Nudity
Sexual attraction
Sexual capital
Sexual selection
Somatotype
Vanity

References 

Human appearance
Fashion
Human body